Josefa Roybal (dates unknown) sometimes known as Josephine or Josepha, was a 20th-century Native American artist, a San Ildefonso Pueblo painter and potter. According to one source, she "most likely was born between 1900 and 1905 and most likely died before 1960."

Life 

Roybal was born in northern New Mexico into a family of Native American artists, notably including the artist Awa Tsireh (also known as Alfonso Roybal). According to Adobe Gallery (which cites the work of Gregory Schaaf), Josefa was the daughter of Alfonsita Martinez and Juan Esteban Roybal; sister of Awa Tsireh (1898–1955), Santana Roybal Martinez (1909-2002), Lupita Roybal, Manuelita Johnson Roybal and painter Raphael Roybal. Her father was the nephew of potter Cresencio Martinez. Her nephew, José Disiderio (J.D.) Roybal, also became a noted painter. Her "maternal grandfather, was a full-blooded Diné of the Navajo Nation, who had been adopted as an infant into the pueblo."

Josefa was "one of the few female Pueblo painters in the first years of the movement" but she did not receive the attention lavished on her brother because the artistic community at that time was dominated by male artists. (Since then, more attention has been paid to the female artists of San Ildefonso Pueblo.)

She sometimes signed her work with an Anglicized version of her name, Josephine, as a convenience for non-Navajo speakers. Her work can be found using both names.

One of her paintings, Comanche Dancers, (ca. 1930–1939), watercolor, ink, and pencil on paper, resides in the collection of the Smithsonian American Art Museum.

References

External links 
 Photo of Comanche Dancers.
 Photo of work crafted by Josefa
Schaaf, Gregory. Pueblo Indian Pottery: 750 Artist Biographies, C. 1800-present: with Value/price Guide Featuring Over 20 Years of Auction Records. Vol. 2. Ciac Press, 2000.
Andrew Connors Pueblo Indian Watercolors: Learning by Looking, A Study Guide (Washington, D.C.: National Museum of American Art, 1993).

People from San Ildefonso Pueblo, New Mexico
Pueblo artists
Painters from New Mexico
20th-century American painters
Native American painters
Navajo painters
Native American women artists
20th-century indigenous painters of the Americas
20th-century American women artists
1900s births
20th-century deaths
Year of birth uncertain
Year of death unknown
20th-century Native Americans
20th-century Native American women
American women painters